The Portrait is a 1993 American made-for-television drama film adapted from the play Painting Churches, directed by Arthur Penn, and starring Gregory Peck and Lauren Bacall. Cecilia Peck, who plays the daughter in the film, is the real-life daughter of actor Gregory Peck and his second wife Veronique Peck. The film was broadcast on TNT on February 13, 1993.

Plot 
Artist Margaret Church returns to her parents home to create a portrait of them. Margaret is shocked to discover that her parents have decided to sell their home, and she has trouble accepting the loss of her childhood home. Margaret finishes her portrait, only to believe that her parents dislike it. Eventually she realizes that her parents do not dislike her portrait, and Margaret becomes closer to them once more.

Cast 
 Gregory Peck as Gardner Church
 Lauren Bacall as Fanny Church
 Cecilia Peck as Margaret Church
 Paul McCrane as Bartel
 Donna Mitchell as Marissa Pindar
 Joyce O'Connor as Samantha Button
 Mitchell Laurance as Ted Button
 William Prince as Hubert Hayden 
 Richard K. Olsen as Doctor

References

External links

1993 television films
1993 drama films
1993 films
TNT Network original films
Films directed by Arthur Penn
Films shot in North Carolina
American drama television films
1990s English-language films
1990s American films